Bingham is an unincorporated community in Grant Township, Page County, Iowa, United States.

History
Bingham's population was 22 in 1902, and 75 in 1925.

References

Unincorporated communities in Page County, Iowa
Unincorporated communities in Iowa